"I Get It" is a 2007 song by Chevelle.

I Get It may also refer to:

 "I Get It", a song by Boom Bip and Doseone from the album Circle, 2000
 "I Get It", a song by Kate Voegele from the album Don't Look Away, 2007
 "I Get It", a song by Lil' Kim from the mixtape Ms. G.O.A.T., 2008
 "I Get It", a song by Meek Mill and Travis Scott from the mixtape Dreamchasers 2, 2012
 "I Get It", a song by the Muffs from the album Whoop Dee Doo, 2014
 "I Get It", a song by Tedashii from the EP This Time Around, 2016
 "I Get It", a 2016 song by Kwame
 "I Get It", a 2020 song by Kelly Rowland

See also
 I Got It (disambiguation)